Maxime Matsima (born 18 November 1940) was a Congolese football goalkeeper who played for People's Republic of the Congo in the 1972 African Cup of Nations.

References

External links

11v11 Profile

Africa Cup of Nations-winning players
Republic of the Congo footballers
Republic of the Congo international footballers
1968 African Cup of Nations players
1972 African Cup of Nations players
1978 African Cup of Nations players
CSMD Diables Noirs players
Association football goalkeepers
2003 deaths
1940 births